Ricardo Agusto Le Fort (born 13 October 1965 in San Miguel de Tucumán) is a former Argentine rugby union player. He played as a hooker.

Le Fort played is entire career for Tucumán Rugby Club in the Nacional de Clubes of Argentina.

He had 6 caps for Argentina, from 1990 to 1995, scoring 1 try, 5 points on aggregate. He was called for the 1991 Rugby World Cup, playing in two games and remaining scoreless, and for the 1995 Rugby World Cup, but this time he didn't leave the bench.

He is the head coach of Argentina Jaguars.

References

External links

1965 births
Living people
Argentine rugby union players
Argentina international rugby union players
Tucumán Rugby Club players
Rugby union hookers
Sportspeople from San Miguel de Tucumán